The A528 is a road that runs from Marchwiel, near Wrexham, in North Wales  to Shrewsbury, Shropshire, in England  On the way it passes through Ellesmere and Coton Hill. The road follows an old route that was Turnpiked in the 18th century.

Route
It heads due south through Cock Bank and Overton Bridge before combining with the A539 road and going eastwards through the village of Overton-on-Dee.

It then heads south east through to Ellesmere, where it shares a small section of road with the A495, before heading south through Crosemere, Harmer Hill, Albrighton and intersecting with the A5124 at Harlescott north east of Shrewsbury.

The final short section into Shrewsbury goes over the Shrewsbury-Chester railway line and intersects with the A5191 in Shrewsbury town centre. A small stub going northwards only (due to the one-way system in Shrewsbury) starts off the A458 road.

Safety
The A528 is one of Wales' most riskiest and dangerous routes. It is third behind the A44 and the A5 for the number of road casualties per year.

References

Roads in Shropshire
Roads in Wrexham County Borough